Hood Hop is the debut album by rapper J-Kwon. It was released on April 6, 2004. Club hit, "Tipsy", was successful on the US, UK and Australian charts. A popular remix of the song features Chingy and Murphy Lee. The LP sold 125,000 copies in its first week of release.

Critical reception

Steve 'Flash' Juon of RapReviews commended J-Kwon for being earnest throughout the trope-filled track listing and making the most of his newfound success "for himself, his neighborhood and his family", but felt the album overall placed him in a position that won't guarantee long-term staying power in hip-hop. AllMusic editor Andy Kellman felt that production team the Trackboyz showed promise based on the single "Tipsy", but found Kwon to be an above-average rapper that only slightly changes his vocal tones. Rolling Stones Christian Hoard and Jon Caramanica criticized the production throughout the record and Kwon's "entry-level" verses, calling him "an argument against drafting high school rappers straight to the pros." Steve Jones from USA Today also criticized Kwon for relying heavily on typical hip-hop scenarios and delivering "uninspired, by-the-numbers tracks ("Parking Lot", "Welcome to tha Hood")", concluding that, "[T]here's got to be more going on around the way than this."

Track listing

Chart positions

Weekly charts

Year-end charts

References

2004 debut albums
J-Kwon albums
So So Def Recordings albums
Albums produced by Bryan-Michael Cox
Albums produced by Jermaine Dupri